is a Japanese beauty pageant contestant who won Miss Universe Japan 2010 on 9 March 2010. Itai, the 13th Miss Universe Japan, accepted the crown from Emiri Miyasaka, Miss Universe Japan 2009.

She competed in Miss Universe 2010 in Las Vegas, but was unplaced.

History
Maiko is an alumna of Aveiro University, Portugal, where she studied English and Portuguese languages.

References

1984 births
Living people
Miss Universe 2010 contestants
People from Ōita Prefecture
Japanese female models
Sophia University alumni
Japanese beauty pageant winners
Models from Ōita Prefecture